Balíček snov is the second studio album by Modus, released on OPUS in 1980.

Track listing

Official releases
 1980: Balíček snov, LP, MC, OPUS, #9116 0999
 1999: Balíček snov: Komplet 3, re-release, CD, Bonton Music Slovakia, #49 4191

Credits and personnel
 Ján Lehotský - lead vocal, chorus, writer, keyboards, piano, Fender piano, Hohner piano, Hohner strings, polymoog, micromoog, 
 Marika Gombitová - lead vocal, chorus
 Miroslav Žbirka - lead vocal, chorus
 Kamil Peteraj - lyrics
 Boris Filan - lyrics
 Július Kinček - notes
 Ladislav Lučenič - bass, electric and acoustic guitar, solo guitar, chorus
 Viliam Pobjecký - solo guita
 Cyril Zeleňák - drums
 Miroslav Jevčák - drums
 Pavol Kozma - drums
 Dušan Hájek - drums
 Ján Lauko - producer
 Peter Smolinský - sound director
 Štefan Danko - responsible editor
 Peter Breza - photography
 Ivan Kostroň - photography

References

General

Specific

External links 
 

1980 albums
Modus (band) albums